Letkhokpin is a village in Singu Township, Pyinoolwin District, Mandalay Division, Myanmar. 

It is located about 3,5 km southeast of Letha Taung, also known as the Singu Plateau, near National Highway 31.

References 

Populated places in Mandalay Region